Apața is a commune in Brașov County, Romania. It is composed of a single village, Apața. It is situated in the traditional region of Transylvania.

The commune is located in the north-central part of the county, at the extreme north of the Burzenland. It sits on the left bank of the Olt River; the Valea Lungă River discharges into the Olt near Apața. 

The Apața train station serves Line 300 of the CFR network, which connects Bucharest with the Hungarian border near Oradea.

At the 2011 census, 45.1% of inhabitants were Romanians, 36.8% Hungarians and 17.9% Roma. At the 2002 census, 37.8% were Evangelical Lutheran, 36.4% Pentecostal, 20.1% Romanian Orthodox and 2.4% had no religion.

Natives
János Apáczai Csere

References

Communes in Brașov County
Localities in Transylvania
Burzenland